Sun Chu (1890-1962) was a Kuomintang officer from Shanxi. He served in the warlord Yan Xishan's provincial army. He achieved a very high rank in Yan's army, eventually commanding Yan's entire military police force, but owed his high position more to his loyalty and trustworthiness than to any particular military ability. Sun Chu was captured alive when the capital of Shanxi, Taiyuan, eventually fell to Communist forces in 1949.

Footnotes

References
 Gillin, Donald G. Warlord: Yen Hsi-shan in Shansi Province 1911-1949. Princeton, New Jersey: Princeton University Press. 1967.

National Revolutionary Army generals from Shanxi
1890 births
1962 deaths
People from Yuncheng